Freshwater sleepers are a small family, the Odontobutidae,  of gobiiform fishes native to freshwater rivers flowing into the South China Sea and the northwestern Pacific Ocean. The family consists of about 22 species in six genera.

Genera
The following genera are currently recognised as being within the family Odontobutidae:

 Micropercops Fowler & Bean, 1920
 Neodontobutis I. S. Chen, Kottelat & H. L. Wu, 2002
 Odontobutis Bleeker, 1874
 Perccottus Dybowski, 1877
 Sineleotris Herre, 1940
 Terateleotris Shibukawa, Iwata & Viravong, 2001

References

Ray-finned fish families